Lectionary 335 (Gregory-Aland), designated by siglum ℓ 335 (in the Gregory-Aland numbering) is a Greek manuscript of the New Testament, on parchment. Palaeographically it has been assigned to the 11th-century. The manuscript has survived in complete condition.

Description 

The original codex contained lessons from the Gospel of John, Matthew and Luke  (Evangelistarium) on 226 parchment leaves.

The text is written in Greek minuscule letters, in two columns per page, 21 lines per page. It has not musical notes.

The codex contains weekday Gospel lessons from Easter to Pentecost and Saturday/Sunday Gospel lessons for the other weeks.

History 

Scrivener and Gregory dated the manuscript to the 11th-century. It is presently assigned by the INTF to the 11th-century.

The manuscript was added to the list of New Testament manuscripts by Scrivener (283e) and Gregory (number 335e). Gregory saw it in 1883.

Formerly it was held in Blenheim (3. C. 14). Currently the codex is housed at the British Library (Add MS 31920) in London. It was digitized by the INTF.

The fragment is not cited in critical editions of the Greek New Testament (UBS4, NA27).

See also 

 List of New Testament lectionaries
 Biblical manuscript
 Textual criticism
 Lectionary 334

References

Bibliography

External links 
 

Greek New Testament lectionaries
11th-century biblical manuscripts
British Library additional manuscripts